The 1911 Fairmount Wheatshockers football team was an American football team that represented Fairmount College (now known as Wichita State University) as an independent during the 1911 college football season. In its third and final season under head coach Roy K. Thomas, the team compiled a 7–1 record. The team was recognized as the Kansas state champion for 1911.

Schedule

References

Fairmount
Wichita State Shockers football seasons
Fairmount Wheatshockers football